The Samworth Church Academy is a coeducational secondary school and sixth form with academy status, located in Mansfield in the English county of Nottinghamshire.

History
The school was established as "The Mansfield Secondary Technical School", which opened in 1945. It was housed in Nissen huts left over by a U.S. Army Hospital after the end of World War II on the outskirts of Mansfield, occupying the same site used by the current King's Mill Hospital.

The school moved to new premises on the opposite side of Mansfield in 1957, becoming known as "Sherwood Hall Secondary School".

In 1958 "The Sherwood Hall School for Girls" was opened, later known as Sherwood Hall Technical School for Girls. Sherwood Hall Technical Grammar School For Boys moved to the site in 1961.

Comprehensive school
The two technical-grammar schools merged in 1976 to become Sherwood Hall Upper School, a coeducational comprehensive school. In 2001 it became Sherwood Hall School and Sixth Form College.

Recent history
Previously a community school administered by Nottinghamshire County Council, Sherwood Hall School converted to academy status on 1 September 2008 and was renamed The Samworth Church Academy. The school is now sponsored by the Church of England Diocese of Southwell and Nottingham and businessman Sir David Samworth,  but continues to coordinate with Nottinghamshire County Council for admissions.

Shortly after converting from a school to academy, in December 2008 planning consent was obtained to erect a new, high, large building upon open space on the opposite side of the site close to the boundary and overlooking rear gardens of nearby residential streets which angered the owners. The new construction was funded by central government.

A Founders Day was held in April 2011. Also in early April 2011, the older school buildings, which were empty, were consumed by fire, the second at the site following arson by teenagers in March.

The new school was officially opened on 18 April 2011 by the Princess Royal.

Curriculum
Samworth Church Academy offers GCSEs, BTECs and OCR Nationals as programmes of study for pupils, while students in the sixth form have the option to study from a range of A Levels and further BTECs.

Notable former pupils

Sherwood Hall Technical School for Girls
 Corinne Hollingworth, TV producer, Executive Producer from 1994-96 of EastEnders, Controller of Drama from 1996-2003 at Channel 5, and Head of Continuing Series from 2004-08 at ITV

See also
 Samworth Enterprise Academy, Leicester

References

External links
Samworth Church Academy official website

Secondary schools in Nottinghamshire
Educational institutions established in 1945
1945 establishments in England
Academies in Nottinghamshire
Church of England secondary schools in the Diocese of Southwell and Nottingham
Schools in Mansfield